Villa is a genus of flies belonging to the bee-fly family (Bombyliidae). The males of some species have a brilliant mat of silvery patagial scales. About 270 Villa species are found on all continents except Antarctica. They can be distinguished from similar genera (Hemipenthes) by their wing venation.

Species

Villa abaddon  (Fabricius, 1794)
Villa adusta (Loew, 1869)
Villa aenea (Coquillett, 1887)
Villa agrippina (Osten Sacken, 1887)
Villa albicollaris Cole, 1923
Villa ariditata Cole, 1923
Villa brunnea Becker, 1916
Villa cana (Meigen, 1804)
Villa chromolepida Cole, 1923
Villa cingulata (Meigen, 1804)
Villa cingulum (Wiedemann in Meigen 1820)
Villa claripennis (Kowarz, 1867)
Villa connexa (Macquart, 1855)
Villa consessor (Coquillett, 1887)
Villa deludens Francois 1966
Villa distincta Meigen in Waltl, 1838
Villa efflatouni El-Hawagry & Greathead, 2006
Villa fasciculata Becker, 1916
Villa faustina (Osten Sacken, 1887)
Villa flavicincta Cole, 1923
Villa flavocostalis Painter, 1926
Villa fumicosta Painter, 1962
Villa gemella (Coquillett, 1892)
Villa gracilis (Macquart, 1840)
Villa haesitans Becker, 1916
Villa halteralis Kowarz, 1883
Villa handfordi Curran, 1935
Villa harveyi (Hine, 1904)
Villa hottentotta (Linnaeus, 1758)
Villa hypomelas (Macquart, 1840)
Villa ixion (Fabricius, 1794)
Villa leucostoma (Meigen, 1820)
Villa livia (Osten Sacken, 1887)
Villa manillae Evenhuis, 1993
Villa melaneura (Loew, 1869)
Villa modesta (Meigen, 1820)
Villa molitor (Loew, 1869)
Villa moneta (Osten Sacken, 1887)
Villa mucorea (Loew, 1869)
Villa nebulo (Coquillett, 1887)
Villa niphobleta (Loew, 1869)
Villa nitida Cole, 1923
Villa occulta <small>(Wiedemann in Meigen 1820)</small>Villa paramuscaria Evenhuis & Hall, 1989Villa peninsularis Cole, 1923Villa praeterissima Francois, 1967Villa pretiosa (Coquillett, 1887)Villa psammina Cole, 1960Villa sabina (Osten Sacken, 1887)Villa salebrosa Painter, 1926Villa scrobiculata (Loew, 1869)Villa senecio (Loew, 1869)Villa sexfasciata Wiedemann, 1821Villa semifulvipes Painter, 1962Villa shawii (Johnson, 1908)Villa sini Cole, 1923Villa sonorensis Cole, 1923Villa squamigera (Coquillett, 1892)Villa stenozoides El-Hawagry & Greathead, 2006Villa stenozona (Loew, 1869)Villa supina (Coquillett, 1887)Villa terrena (Coquillett, 1892)Villa tomentosa Becker, 1916Villa vacans (Coquillett, 1887)Villa vanduzeei Cole, 1923Villa vasitias (Cole, 1923)Villa venusta (Meigen, 1820)Villa vestita'' (Walker, 1849)

References

Bombyliidae
Brachycera genera
Taxa named by Johan Christian Fabricius